In 4-dimensional geometry, the cubic pyramid is bounded by one cube on the base and 6 square pyramid cells which meet at the apex. Since a cube has a circumradius divided by edge length less than one, the square pyramids can be made with regular faces by computing the appropriate height.

Images

Related polytopes and honeycombs
Exactly 8 regular cubic pyramids will fit together around a vertex in four-dimensional space (the apex of each pyramid). This construction yields a tesseract with 8 cubical bounding cells, surrounding a central vertex with 16 edge-length long radii. The tesseract tessellates 4-dimensional space as the tesseractic honeycomb. The 4-dimensional content of a unit-edge-length tesseract is 1, so the content of the regular cubic pyramid is 1/8.

The regular 24-cell has cubic pyramids around every vertex. Placing 8 cubic pyramids on the cubic bounding cells of a tesseract is Gosset's construction of the 24-cell. Thus the 24-cell is constructed from exactly 16 cubic pyramids. The 24-cell tessellates 4-dimensional space as the 24-cell honeycomb.

The dual to the cubic pyramid is an octahedral pyramid, seen as an octahedral base, and 8 regular tetrahedra meeting at an apex.

A cubic pyramid of height zero can be seen as a cube divided into 6 square pyramids along with the center point. These square pyramid-filled cubes can tessellate three-dimensional space as a dual of the truncated cubic honeycomb, called a hexakis cubic honeycomb, or pyramidille.

References

External links

  
 Richard Klitzing, Axial-Symmetrical Edge Facetings of Uniform Polyhedra

4-polytopes